Pwyll is an impact crater on the surface of Jupiter's moon Europa. It is thought to be one of the youngest features on the moon. The crater was first observed from Voyager images in 1986, and the name was officially recognized by the IAU in 1997, after Pwyll of Welsh mythology.

Description
Pwyll crater is estimated to be 18 million years old or younger.

The bright white color suggests a composition of water ice particles. In addition to the white rays, the impact also produced a multitude of smaller secondary craters, which are largest near the center of each ray, and close to the central crater.

See also
List of craters on Europa
List of geological features on Europa

References

External links 
Planetary Photojournal image page
NASA Europa images

Impact craters on Jupiter's moons
Surface features of Europa (moon)